David Gnaniah Pothirajulu (19th September 1936 - 5th September 2020)   was the third Bishop of Madurai-Ramnad, serving from 1978 to 1994.

Pothirajulu completed his studies with a doctorate at Boston University. He was a Lecturer at the Tamil Nadu Theological Seminary until his elevation to the episcopate.

Notes

 
 

20th-century Anglican bishops in India
Indian bishops
Indian Christian religious leaders
Anglican bishops of Madurai-Ramnad
1936 births
2020 deaths
Boston University alumni
Academic staff of Tamil Nadu Theological Seminary